Stenidea verticalis is a species of beetle in the family Cerambycidae. It was described by Thomson in 1868. It is known from South Africa.

References

verticalis
Beetles described in 1868